is a Japanese Judoka. He won the gold medal in the under 100 kg class at the 2000 Summer Olympics. He is well known for his specialty throws, Uchi Mata (inner thigh throw) and Ōuchi gari (major inner reap).

He is considered by the Judo community as one of the best competitive judoka. His notable accomplishments include three golds at the World Championship and All Japan Championship (one of four Judokas who have accomplished this).

His older brother, Tomokazu Inoue is also judoka and former Asian champion.

He is affiliated with Sohgo Security Services (Alsok), a security firm.

Biography 

Kosei Inoue won the gold medal at the 2000 Sydney Olympics in the -100 kg division, most notably doing so by winning every single match by ippon. At the victory ceremony, he carried a photograph of his recently-deceased mother onto the podium.

At the 2004 Athens Olympics, Kosei Inoue was chosen as the captain of the Japanese team. He was highly favored to win another gold in the u100 kg division. However, he suffered a major upset and did not place. Elco van der Geest of the Netherlands (2002 European Champion) defeated Inoue at the last minute with a drop seoi nage (shoulder throw) in the quarter final. Movlud Miraliyev of Azerbaijan countered Inoue's o-uchi gari with a ura nage to win the match during Repechage Round 3.

In 2005 he won the gold at the Jigoro Kano International Cup, which is an A level contest with many former world and Olympic medalists.

He did not compete until 2007 because of a shoulder injury in 2005 and returned at +100 kg

At the 2008 All-Japan Judo Championships, Inoue lost to Yohei Takai by ippon, which ended his hopes of joining the Olympic team headed for Beijing. He promptly announced his retirement from international competition.  Inoue was replaced by Satoshi Ishii, who defeated Keiji Suzuki in the final bout of the 2008 AJJC (International Herald Tribune, April 29, 2008) and won a gold medal in the 2008 Olympic Games.

Personal life 
Inoue married Japanese actress and television personality Aki Higashihara on January 14, 2008. After announcing his retirement from competitive judo, Inoue was selected by the Japan Olympic Committee to travel to the UK in order to learn English. After living in Edinburgh, Scotland (and training with the Scottish-based GB team members) for 6 months he moved to London to teach at the Budokwai for 12 months before returning to Japan as the Men's Heavyweight coach for the National team.
Following Japan's least successful Olympics for Judo at the London 2012 Olympic Games, it was announced that Inoue would succeed Shinichi Shinohara as the new head coach of the national team.

Achievements

References

External links

 
 
 Judo Legends
 Competition videos of Kosei Inoue on Judovision.org
 Kosei Inoue podcast: "My Life in Judo"

1978 births
Living people
Tokai University alumni
People from Miyakonojō
Sportspeople from Miyazaki Prefecture
Japanese male judoka
Olympic judoka of Japan
Judoka at the 2000 Summer Olympics
Judoka at the 2004 Summer Olympics
Olympic gold medalists for Japan
Jacket Wrestlers
Japanese expatriates in the United Kingdom
People associated with Edinburgh
Olympic medalists in judo
Asian Games medalists in judo
World judo champions
Judoka at the 1998 Asian Games
Judoka at the 2002 Asian Games
Medalists at the 2000 Summer Olympics
Asian Games gold medalists for Japan
Medalists at the 1998 Asian Games
Medalists at the 2002 Asian Games
Oath takers at the Olympic Games